Remember When (stylized as Remember WHEN...) is a music program aired on TeleRadyo which is hosted by DJ Reggie Valdez. The program is aired every Sunday from 3:00 pm – 5:00 pm with simulcast on The Filipino Channel worldwide. This program is named after the song from The Platters of the same name and it is also their theme song of the program. This program plays music of the 1960s, 1970s, and 1980s. The program is the successor of the music program Music and Memories which aired from 2007 to 2013.

The program went on hiatus due to the ongoing COVID-19 pandemic starting March 22, 2020, until further notice.

Anchors
Current:
DJ Reggie Valdez (2020–present)
Former:
Norma Marco (2013–2019)
Guest DJ
Rod Izon (2019–2020)

About
The show plays music from the 1960s, 1970s, and 1980s.

See also
TeleRadyo
DZMM
Yesterday

Philippine radio programs
2013 radio programme debuts